Sir John Anderson  (23 January 1858 – 24 March 1918) was a Scottish colonial administrator who served as Governor of Ceylon between 1916 and 1918, and Governor of the Straits Settlements between 1904 and 1911.

Education
He was the only son of John Anderson, the Superintendent of the Gordon Mission, Aberdeen. Before he was twenty, he graduated MA at Aberdeen University, gaining a first class in mathematics and being awarded the gold medal of the year.

Career
Two years after graduating, he entered the Colonial Office as a second class clerk. In 1887, he was Bacon Scholar of Gray's Inn, and in the following year, he was the Inns of Court student.

He proceeded with Sir John Frederick Dickson in 1891 to Gibraltar, in order to inquire into the matters connected with the Registry of the Supreme Court. He was next appointed as the private secretary to Sir R. Meade, Permanent Under-Secretary of the State for the Colonies, in 1892 he served as the British Agent for Bering Sea Arbitration.

From 1883 to 1897 he edited the Colonial Office List, later he appointed as the principal clerk. He became the secretary to the Conference between Joseph Chamberlain and the Colonial Premiers in that year he had considerable opportunities of gaining an intimate knowledge of the feelings of the self-governing colonies. For the second time, he was despatched to Gibraltar in 1899, on this occasion to inquire into the rates of pay of the Civil Service there. He returned to London in the same year and remained until 1901, where Chamberlain chose him as Colonial Office representative to accompany T.R.H. the Prince and Princess of Wales, then the Duke and Duchess of York, on their famous tour around British Empire on board HMS Ophir. It was during that trip that Sir John saw for the first time the colony over which he would preside.

In 1902, again he acted as the secretary to the Colonial Conference, and in 1903, he received thanks of the Canadian Government and the Confederation medal for services rendered in connection with the Alaska Boundary question and other matters.

In 1904, he was appointed as Governor of Straits Settlements where he served till 1911. In 1916, he was appointed as Governor of British Ceylon. In Ceylon, he played a major role in settling many problems and riots that started in 1915 and suppressed harshly by the British.

He suddenly fell ill at Queens Cottage, Nuwara Eliya in 1918 and died on 24 March 1918. It is recorded that his Maha Mudaliyar, Sir Solomon Dias Bandaranaike, who happened to be at his bedside, wrote:

Honours
He was appointed as a Companion of the Order of St Michael and St George (CMG) in 1898, and a Knight Commander of the Order of St Michael and St George (KCMG) in 1901 when he was due to accompany the Duke and Duchess of York. In 1906, he was awarded LL.D. from his former alma mater.

Anderson School in Ipoh, Malaysia was named after the then High Commissioner of the Malay States, Sir John Anderson, the school was formally opened on 6 February 1909.

Anderson Road and Anderson bridge in Singapore was also named in his honour.

References

Daily News
 Arnold Wright, Twentieth Century Impressions of British Malaya, 1908

1858 births
1918 deaths
People from Marr
Alumni of the University of Aberdeen
Knights Grand Cross of the Order of St Michael and St George
Knights Commander of the Order of the Bath
Governors of British Ceylon
Governors of the Straits Settlements
Permanent Under-Secretaries of State for the Colonies
Scottish justices of the peace
Scottish colonial officials
Scottish knights
Scottish Roman Catholics
Administrators in British Singapore